Utopians may refer to:
 Utopians (film), a 2015 film by Hong Kong filmmaker Scud 
 Those who believe in the principles behind, or the likelihood of the existence of, Utopia

See also
 Utopia (disambiguation)